Crotonaldehyde is a chemical compound with the formula CH3CH=CHCHO.  The compound is usually sold as a mixture of the E- and Z-isomers, which differ with respect to the relative position of the methyl and formyl groups.  The E-isomer is more common (data given in Table is for the E-isomer).  This lachrymatory liquid is moderately soluble in water and miscible in organic solvents.  As an unsaturated aldehyde, crotonaldehyde is a versatile intermediate in organic synthesis.  It occurs in a variety of foodstuffs, e.g. soybean oils.

Production and reactivity
Crotonaldehyde is produced by the aldol condensation of acetaldehyde:
2 CH3CHO   →   CH3CH=CHCHO  +  H2O

Crotonaldehyde is a multifunctional molecule that exhibits diverse reactivity.  It is a prochiral dienophile.  It is a Michael acceptor.  Addition of methylmagnesium chloride produces 3-penten-2-ol.

Polyurethane catalyst N,N,N′,N′-tetramethyl-1,4-butanediamine (also known as NIAX TMBDA) was obtained by hydrogenating the reaction product of crotonaldehyde and dimethylamine.

Uses

It is a precursor to fine chemicals.  Sorbic acid, a food preservative, and trimethylhydroquinone, a precursor to the vitamin E, are prepared from crotonaldehyde.  Other derivatives include crotonic acid and 3-methoxybutanol.  It adds two equivalents of urea to give the pyrimidine derivative that is employed as a controlled-release fertilizer.

Safety
Crotonaldehyde is a potent irritant even at the ppm levels.

See also
 Crotyl
 Crotonic acid
 Crotyl alcohol
 Methacrolein

References

External links
 Hazardous Substance Fact Sheet
 CDC - NIOSH Pocket Guide to Chemical Hazards

Alkenals
Lachrymatory agents
Hazardous materials